Paris is Burning is a 2006 EP release by American musician St. Vincent. "These Days" is a cover of a Nico song – written by Jackson Browne – from her album Chelsea Girl.

Track listing

References

2006 EPs
St. Vincent (musician) albums
Baroque pop albums
Self-released EPs